William Gunary (5 August 1895 – 26 January 1969) was an English cricketer.

Biography
He was a right-handed batsman and a left-arm medium-fast bowler who played for Essex. He was born in Dagenham and died in Upminster.

Gunary represented Essex in one match during the 1929 season, against Leicestershire. The match, which finished in a draw, saw Gunary finish with a duck in the first innings, and unable to bat in the second.

External links
William Gunary at Cricket Archive

1895 births
1969 deaths
People from Dagenham
Sportspeople from Essex
English cricketers
Essex cricketers